Anne McArdle is a physiologist at the University of Liverpool.

Education
McArdle graduated with a Bachelor's in Biochemistry from the University of Liverpool in 1988 and completed her PhD studying muscle damage using the mdx mouse model of Duchenne muscular dystrophy.

Career and research
McArdle undertook postdoctoral training at the University of Michigan in the laboratories of John Faulkner and was awarded a Research into Ageing Fellowship in 1998 working on sarcopenia. She was appointed as Professor at the University of Liverpool in 2007 and has served as Head of the Department of musculoskeletal biology.

References

Year of birth missing (living people)
Living people
British physiologists
Women physiologists
 University of Michigan fellows